= Hatai Khedi =

- village
- Location within Madhya Pradesh Location within India
- Coordinates: 23.2042297°N 77.2218338°E
- Country: India
- State: Madhya Pradesh
- District: Bhopal
- Tehsil: Huzur
- Elevation: 516 m (1,693 ft)

Population (2011)
  - Total: 247
- Time zone: UTC+5:30 (IST)
- ISO 3166 code: MP-IN
- 2011 census code: 482487

Hatai Khedi is a village in the Bhopal district of Madhya Pradesh, India. It is located in the Huzur tehsil and the Phanda block.

== Demographics ==
According to the 2011 census of India, Hatai Khedi has 54 households. The effective literacy rate (i.e. the literacy rate of population excluding children aged 6 and below) is 71.15%.

Demographics (2011 Census)
	Total	Male	Female
Population	247	128	119
Children aged below 6 years	39	21	18
Scheduled caste	167	89	78
Scheduled tribe	9	3	6
Literates	148	89	59
Workers (all)	73	69	4
Main workers (total)	28	27	1
Main workers: Cultivators	27	27	0
Main workers: Agricultural labourers	0	0	0
Main workers: Household industry workers	0	0	0
Main workers: Other	1	0	1
Marginal workers (total)	45	42	3
Marginal workers: Cultivators	1	1	0
Marginal workers: Agricultural labourers	43	40	3
Marginal workers: Household industry workers	0	0	0
Marginal workers: Others	1	1	0
Non-workers	174	59	115
